Pieter van Jaarsveld, professionally known as Bobby van Jaarsveld, (born 6 March 1987) is a South African Afrikaans-language pop singer-songwriter and actor.

Early life
Van Jaarsveld, who was nicknamed "Bobby" after his father, was born on 6 March 1987 in Paarl, Western Cape. He is the second of three children and has two sisters, one of whom is also a singer (Karlien van Jaarsveld). As a child, he attended several primary schools before matriculating from Brits High School.

Career

Music
Van Jaarsveld started his professional singing career in high school when he was offered singing record, and he released his first solo album in his last year. He won the award for Best Newcomer at the Huisgenoot Tempo Awards in 2006 after receiving three nominations from the Klein Karoo Nasionale Kunstefees, Vonk (a local music magazine) and  Huisgenoot Tempo magazine. As the winner of this category, Van Jaarsveld performed at the Skouspel Extravaganza hosted at Sun City, and continued to do until 2011.

In November 2006, Theuns Jordaan Productions offered Van Jaarsveld a recording contract. His first album, 'n Duisend Ure, was released later that year and album sales reached gold status. His second album, Net Vir Jou, was released in 2009 by Coleske Artists. Van Jaarsveld wrote and composed each of the tracks on the album. Album sales reached platinum status within eight weeks, and have since reached double platinum status with sales of 83,000 units. Songs from the album include Spieëltjie and Net Vir Jou.

In January 2010, Van Jaarsveld was awarded the Viewers' Favourite Artist award for 2001 on DKNT, a local music program on DStv. That same year, "Spieëltjie", a song from his second album, won Best Afrikaans Song at both the Huisgenot Tempo and Vonk Awards. He went on to release two more albums, "Wat Geld Nie Kan Koop Nie" and "Maak 'n Wens" in 2012 and 2014, respectively.

Film and television
Van Jaarsveld played the lead character in the Afrikaans film Liefling – Die Movie, which was released in November 2010 by Hartiwood Studios South Africa and fetched R16 million at the local box office. He also starred in the film As Jy Sing in 2013. As of January 2016, Van Jaarsveld is a judge on the local singing competition, The Voice SA.

Accolades 
Bobby has received numerous awards and nominations (Award names kept in original language).

 Personal life 
Van Jaarsveld is a professed Christian. He and his wife Annatjie van Jaarsveld, whom he married in January 2011, have two sons, Sion and Leben  and a daughter named Armani  In 2018 van Jaarsveld and his family decide to leave their home in Pretoria and relocated to Ballito.

 Discography 
Studio albums

Singles
2009: "Spieëltjie"
2010: "Net vir jou"
2011: "Kyk Waar is ons Nou"
2013: "'n Vrou wil dit hoor"
2014: "My Alles"
2015: "Een vir Een"
2017: "HOLY"
2020: "Sprokie (featuring Early B)"

Filmography
 Liefling – Die Movie (2010)
 As Jy Sing'' (2013)

References

1987 births
Living people
South African singer-songwriters
Afrikaans-language singers
Afrikaner people
21st-century South African male singers
South African male television actors
21st-century South African male actors
People from Paarl